The Mystery Train is a 1931 American film directed by Phil Whitman.

Plot
Marian Radcliffe and William Mortimer (her lawyer) help Joan Lane, who was wrongly convicted, escape from police custody after a train wreck. Radcliffe then uses Lane in a scheme to have her marry Ronald Stanhope; so Marian can avoid having to declare bankruptcy after she lost heavily in the stock market.

Cast
Hedda Hopper as Mrs. Marian Radcliffe
Marceline Day as Joan Lane
Nick Stuart as Ronald Stanhope
Bryant Washburn as William Mortimer
Al Cooke as The Bridegroom
Mary MacLaren as Nurse
Carol Tevis as The Bride
Joseph W. Girard as Sheriff
Spec O'Donnell as Caddy
Eddie Fetherston as Archie Benson

External links 

1931 films
American crime drama films
American mystery films
American black-and-white films
1931 crime drama films
1930s mystery films
Films directed by Phil Whitman
1930s English-language films
1930s American films